This Is Tim Hardin is an album by folk artist Tim Hardin, released in 1967.

These early recordings from approximately 1964 were not issued until 1967 when Hardin had achieved success with his albums for Verve. The songs are in a more straight blues style than his later folk, rock and pop stylings.

Reception 

In his review for Allmusic, music critic Richie Unterberger wrote "The material isn't nearly as distinctive as the best of Hardin's work, but the performances rank with Dave Van Ronk and Fred Neil as the best white blues/acoustic folk to emerge from the early-'60s Greenwich scene... it's still well worth tracking down."

Track listing

Side one 
 "I Can't Slow Down" (Tim Hardin) – 3:28
 "Blues on the Ceilin'" (Fred Neil) – 3:56
 "Stagger Lee" (Traditional) – 3:11
 "(I'm Your) Hoochie Coochie Man" (Willie Dixon) – 4:20
 "I've Been Working on the Railroad" (Traditional) – 1:51

Side two 
 "House of the Rising Sun" (Traditional) – 4:09
 "Fast Freight" (Terry Gilkyson, Hardin) – 4:05
 "Cocaine Bill" (Traditional) – 2:55
 "You Got to Have More Than One Woman" (Tim Hardin) – 2:01
 "Danville Dame" (Hardin, Steve Weber) – 2:05

Personnel 
Tim Hardin – vocals, guitar

References 

1967 albums
Tim Hardin albums
Atco Records albums